Discomyza is a genus of shore flies in the family Ephydridae.

Species
D. africana Cresson, 1939
D. baechlii Zatwarnicki & Mathis, 2007
D. dolichocerus Cresson, 1944
D. eritrea Cresson, 1939
D. fagomoga Zatwarnicki & Cielniak, 2015
D. incurva (Fallen, 1823)
D. maculipennis (Wiedemann, 1924)
D. maritima Krivosheina, 1987
D. similis Lamb, 1912

References

Ephydridae
Taxa named by Johann Wilhelm Meigen
Diptera of Europe
Diptera of Africa
Diptera of Asia
Diptera of North America
Brachycera genera